The 1991 BMW European Indoors was a women's tennis tournament played on indoor carpet courts at the Saalsporthalle Allmend in Zürich in Switzerland and was part of Tier II of the 1991 WTA Tour. It was the eighth edition of the tournament and was held from 7 October through 13 October 1991. First-seeded Steffi Graf won the singles title, her fifth at the event, and earned $70,000 first-prize money.

Finals

Singles
 Steffi Graf defeated  Nathalie Tauziat 6–4, 6–4
 It was Graf's 6th singles title of the year and the 60th of her career.

Doubles
 Jana Novotná /  Andrea Strnadová defeated  Zina Garrison-Jackson /  Lori McNeil 6–4, 6–3

References

External links
 ITF tournament edition details
 Tournament draws

European Indoors
Zurich Open
1991 in Swiss tennis